Lenny Krayzelburg (born September 28, 1975, as Leonid Krayzelburg;) is an American former backstroke swimmer, Olympic gold medalist, and former world record holder. He swam in the 2000 and 2004 Olympics, winning a total of four Olympic gold medals.

Early years
Krayzelburg is Jewish, and was born to Jewish parents in Odessa (then Soviet Union, now Ukraine). Krayzelburg and his family left the Soviet Union in 1989 for the United States. They settled in Los Angeles.

After their immigration, Krayzelburg's family suffered from financial difficulties. He had to commute by bus and on foot 45 minutes each way to swimming practice, and did not get home before 9:30 in the evening. In addition, Lenny had to cope with language problems, and to study English rapidly in order to understand his coaches' instructions. Thankfully he was aided by the extensive Russian community in Los Angeles, and managed to adapt quickly.

College
Lenny first attended Fairfax High School, and then attended Santa Monica College where he won both the 100 and  backstroke junior college titles.  His coach at Santa Monica recognized his talent and recommended him to Mark Schubert at the University of Southern California.  Lenny transferred to USC.  In 1995, he became a naturalized citizen of the United States.  Three years later, he became the first swimmer since 1986 to sweep the backstroke events, 100 m & 200 m, in the World Championships.

In 1999, Krayzelburg broke the 50, 100 and the 200 m world records respectively, setting the clock on 24.99, 53.60 and 1:55.87. He was then recognized as the top backstroke swimmer in the world and one of the best in the history of this swimming style.

He continued to dominate at the 2000 Summer Olympics backstroke, shattering the Olympic record and nearing his own 1999 world record with 53.72 in the 100, while making another Olympic record in the 200 with a 1:56.76. He also played an important role in helping the American team win a gold medal in the 4 × 100 m relay with a new world record of 3:33.73.

Maccabiah Games
After the Olympics Krayzelburg decided to skip the 2001 World Championships that took place in Fukuoka, Japan, in order to focus on the 2001 Maccabiah Games in Israel.  Being Jewish, Krayzelburg wanted to take this once-in-a-lifetime chance to compete with other top Jewish athletes.  In addition, he wanted to fulfill a childhood dream by visiting the holy land, and lifting the American delegate flag during the games' opening ceremony.  He was selected to carry in the flag for the United States at the opening ceremonies. He then earned gold and set a new Maccabiah record in the 100-meter backstroke.  He also won a gold medal in the 4×100-meter medley relay.

At the 2017 Maccabiah Games, in the special 4x50m relay race between Israeli and American all-star teams, American Olympic champions Krayzelburg, Jason Lezak (four Olympic golds), and Anthony Ervin (three Olympic golds), with masters swimmer Alex Blavatnik, swam a time of 1:48.23 and defeated Israeli Olympians Guy Barnea, Yoav Bruck, Eran Groumi, and Tal Stricker, who had a time of 1:51.25.

Difficulties, perseverance
A couple of months later he had to undergo surgery on his left shoulder, following a fall while running on a treadmill, after which he had to take a year off swimming.

In September 2003, Krazelburg split from his coach Mark Schubert, to start training under Dave Salo, who also coached Aaron Peirsol. Peirsol was considered by many to be Krayzelburg's successor. Working with Salo, Krayzelburg changed the style of his stroke, particularly due to his shoulder injuries.

Success
This turn in Krayzelburg's career proved to be successful. He finished second in the American trials for the 100 meters event to secure a place in the 2004 Athens Olympics, alongside training partner, Aaron Peirsol. His good shape enabled him to reach the finals. He came into this final knowing this might be his career's last, but missed out on a medal by just 2/100 of a second, with a qualitative result of 54.38, whereas Peirsol won gold with 54.06. Krayzelburg made up for the upset by helping the American team to win yet another Olympic gold in the 4 x 100 m relay, despite not swimming in the final of this event (he swam in the preliminary round, while Peirsol took his spot in the final).

Krayzelburg is known as one of the physically strongest swimmers around, and for his powerful arm strokes, a product of his training regimen and bodybuilder-esque physique.

Lenny owes many of his career achievements to his father Oleg, who has often encouraged him, even when Lenny wanted to quit at the age of 14. He enjoys reading as well as working with computers.

Krayzelburg was named Sportsman of the Year by the United States Olympic Committee in 1998, and was chosen USA Swimmer of the Year each of the following two years. In 2001, he was inducted into the Southern California Jewish Sports Hall of Fame and USC Hall of Fame.

See also

 List of multiple Olympic gold medalists
 List of multiple Olympic gold medalists at a single Games
 List of Olympic medalists in swimming (men)
 List of select Jewish swimmers
 List of University of Southern California people
 List of World Aquatics Championships medalists in swimming (men)
 World record progression 50 metres backstroke
 World record progression 100 metres backstroke
 World record progression 200 metres backstroke
 World record progression 4 × 100 metres medley relay

References

External links
 
 
 
 
 
 

1975 births
Living people
American male backstroke swimmers
American people of Ukrainian-Jewish descent
World record setters in swimming
Jewish American sportspeople
Jewish swimmers
Maccabiah Games gold medalists for the United States
Maccabiah Games medalists in swimming
Competitors at the 2001 Maccabiah Games
Competitors at the 2017 Maccabiah Games
Medalists at the 2004 Summer Olympics
Medalists at the 2000 Summer Olympics
Medalists at the FINA World Swimming Championships (25 m)
Olympic gold medalists for the United States in swimming
Sportspeople from Odesa
Odesa Jews
Swimmers from Los Angeles
Swimmers at the 2000 Summer Olympics
Swimmers at the 2004 Summer Olympics
Ukrainian SSR emigrants to the United States
USC Trojans men's swimmers
World Aquatics Championships medalists in swimming
Goodwill Games medalists in swimming
Competitors at the 1998 Goodwill Games
21st-century American Jews